The Application of the Convention on the Prevention and Punishment of the Crime of Genocide (The Gambia v. Myanmar), commonly referred to as the Rohingya genocide case, is a case which is currently being heard by the International Court of Justice (ICJ). The case was brought forward by the Republic of The Gambia, on behalf of 57 members of the Organisation of Islamic Cooperation in 2019.

Background 
The Rohingya people are a Muslim Indo-Aryan ethnic minority which has faced mass persecution and ethnic cleansing in Buddhist-majority Myanmar in recent years. The persecution of the Rohingya has been described as a genocide. The government of Myanmar deems them illegal immigrants, but the Rohingya people argue they have lived in the area for generations and that the government of Myanmar's treatment of them is unfair to the Muslims of Myanmar as a whole.

According to The Economist, regarding Aung San Suu Kyi's motivation for taking up the defendants' cause, "It is hard to escape the conclusion that she is exploiting the Rohingyas' misery to boost her party's prospects in elections due in 2020."

Aung San Suu Kyi describes this conflict as an "internal armed conflict" that was triggered by Rohingya attacks on the government of Myanmar. The judge who is presiding over the case, Abdulqawi Ahmed Yusuf, has given Myanmar four months to implement his rulings: Myanmar must take "all measure within its power" to prevent genocide.

Procedural history 
On 11 November 2019, The Gambia lodged a 35-page application with the ICJ against Myanmar, initiating the case on the basis of the erga omnes character of the obligations enshrined in the Genocide Convention. The application alleged that Myanmar has committed mass murder, rape and destruction of communities against the Rohingya group in Rakhine state since about October 2016 and that these actions violate the Genocide Convention. Outside counsel for The Gambia includes a team from the law firm Foley Hoag led by Paul Reichler, as well as Professors Philippe Sands of University College London and Payam Akhavan of McGill University. On the other side, leader and State Counsellor Aung San Suu Kyi is representing Myanmar, along with a legal team.

The Gambia also submitted a request for the indication of provisional measures of protection. The ICJ held a public hearing on that request for three days, 10–12 December 2019.  A commentator described the hearing as a "remarkable spectacle," noting that The Gambia's team provided "brutal descriptions" of atrocities, while Aung San Suu Kyi avoided using the word "Rohingya"—except in a reference to the Arakan Rohingya Salvation Army.

On 23 January 2020, the ICJ issued an order on The Gambia's request for provisional measures.  The order "indicated" (i.e., issued) provisional measures ordering Myanmar to prevent genocidal acts against the Rohingya Muslims during the pendency of the case, and to report regularly on its implementation of the order.

The Court issued a procedural order on the same date, setting filing deadlines of 23 July 2020 for The Gambia's Memorial, and 25 January 2021 for Myanmar's responsive Counter-Memorial.

On 18 May 2020, The Court issued an extension for The Gambia's memorial and set a filing deadline of 23 October 2020. Similarly, an extension was granted to Myanmar set at 23 July 2021.

Analysis
Analyzing the decision in the blog of the European Journal of International Law, Marko Milanovic, a professor at the University of Nottingham School of Law, called the Court's order "obviously a win for The Gambia, and for the Rohingya cause more generally", but also stated that the order largely only replicated existing "state obligations under the Genocide Convention", and did not include the broader measures and statements that The Gambia had requested.

See also 
 List of International Court of Justice cases

References

External links 
 ICJ page on the case with all available official documents
 Recap of provisional measures hearing from Opinio Juris blog, day 1 (10 December 2019)
 Recap of provisional measures hearing from Opinio Juris blog, day 2 (11 December 2019)
 Recap of provisional measures hearing  from Opinio Juris blog, day 3 (12 December 2019)
 Order on provisional measures (23 January 2020)
 Separate opinion of Vice-President Xue
 Separate opinion of Judge Cançado Trindade
 Declaration of Judge ad hoc Kress

2019 in international relations
International Court of Justice cases
Genocide case
Genocides in Asia